Abd al-Wahhab al-Sha'rani (1492/3–1565, AH 898–973, full name  ) was an Egyptian Shafi'i scholar and mystic, founder of an Egyptian order of Sufism, eponymously known as . The order gradually declined after Shaʿrani's death, although it remained active until the 19th century. Sharani's master was the prominent Shaykh Ali al-Khawas.

Besides voluminous mystic writings, he also composed an epitome of a 

His seminal work Al-Mīzan al-Kubra (The Supreme Scale)  compares the rulings of all four Sunni schools of sharia as if they were a single school. He considered the differences, according to their difficulty, as either strictness ('azima) or dispensation (rukhsa).

Works 
 Al-Ajwiba-t al-Marḍiyya  
 Al-Kibrīt al-Aḥmar  
 Al-Mīzan al-Kubra  (The Supreme Scale) [Arabic ed. Cairo: al-Maṭābi` al-Amīriyya, 1900.  2 vols.]
 Al-Tabaqat al-Kubra  (The supreme levels)
 Lata'if al-minan wa al-akhlaq  (Subtleties of gifts and character)
 Lawaqih al-anwar al-qudsiyya  (The fecundating sacred illuminations)
 Kitab al-yawaqit wa al-jawahir fī bayan 'aqa'id al-akabir  (The book of rubies and jewels: an explanation of the tenets of faith of mystic luminaries).
 Al-Jawahir wa al-Durar  (The jewels and pearls)
 Durar al-Ghawas li sayyidi Ali al-Khawas 
 Al-Kawkab al-shahiq fī al-farq bayn al-Mureed al-sadiq wa Ghayri sadiq 
 Mawazin al-qaswirin min shuyukhin wa muridin 
 al-Fulk al-mashḥūn fī bayān anna l-taṣawwuf huwa mā takhluqu bihi al-'ulamā' al-'āmilūn

See also 
 Ibn Arabi
 List of Sufis
 List of Ash'aris and Maturidis
 List of Muslim theologians

References

  C. Brockelmann, Geschichte der arabischen Litteratur (GAL), 1st edition, 2 vols. (Leiden: Brill, 1889–1936), vol. 2, pp. 335–8.
 M. Winter, 'Shaʿrānī' in Gibbs et al. (eds.), The Encyclopaedia of Islam, 2nd edition, 11 vols. (Leiden: E.J. Brill, 1960–2002), vol. 9, p. 316.

Asharis
Shafi'is
Mujaddid
Sunni Sufis
Sufi mystics
Sufi teachers
Sufi writers
Sunni imams
Sunni Muslim scholars of Islam
Supporters of Ibn Arabi
1492 births
1565 deaths
16th-century Egyptian people
16th-century jurists